The first season of the American television comedy series Louie premiered on June 29, 2010 and concluded on September 7, 2010. It consisted of thirteen episodes, each running approximately 23 minutes in length. FX broadcast the first season on Tuesdays at 11:00 pm in the United States. The season was produced by 3 Arts Entertainment and the executive producers were Louis C.K., Dave Becky and M. Blair Breard. The first season was released on DVD and Blu-ray in region 1 on June 21, 2011.

Louie was created, written and directed by Louis C.K., who stars as a fictionalized version of himself, a comedian and newly divorced father raising his two daughters in New York City. The show has a loose format atypical for television comedy series, consisting of largely unconnected storylines and segments (described as "extended vignettes") that revolve around Louie's life, punctuated by live stand-up performances.

The season received critical acclaim.

Plot
The series is loosely based on Louis C.K.'s life, showing him as a comic onstage, and depicting his life offstage as a newly divorced father of two girls. Each episode features either two stories that may or may not connect thematically, or a longer full-episode story (often consisting of numerous connected shorter pieces), all of which revolve around Louie. The pieces are interspersed with segments of C.K.'s stand-up comedy, usually performed in small New York comedy clubs, mainly the Comedy Cellar and Carolines in Manhattan. The stand-up in the show consists of original material recorded for the series, and is usually shot from the stage rather than from the more traditional audience perspective. Sometimes these comedy segments are integrated into the stories themselves, other times they simply serve to bookend them with a loosely connected topic. In Season 1, short awkward conversations between Louie and his therapist are also shown occasionally. 

Episodes in the series have standalone plots, although some recurring roles (Louie's playdate friend Pamela, portrayed by Pamela Adlon, his co-star from Lucky Louie) occasionally provide story arc continuity between episodes. Continuity is not enforced; there were two very different characters and actresses that served as Louie's mother in separate episodes. Episode 7, "Double Date/Mom" portrays a very unpleasant woman as Louie's mother, played by Mary Louise Wilson. By contrast, in episode 10, "God", a flashback to Louie's childhood shows the young Louie's mother as a very different woman with a nice personality, played by Amy Landecker. Landecker portrayed present-day Louie's date earlier in the season, in episode 9, "Bully". As C.K. explained, "Every episode has its own goal, and if it messes up the goal of another episode, [...] I just don't care." Some stories also take place outside of the series timeline, such as "God", which depicts Louie's childhood, and "Oh Louie", which shows the comedian 9 years earlier in his career. 

The pilot episode includes segments on a school field trip and an awkward first date, with subsequent episodes covering a diverse range of material including divorce, sex, depression, sexual orientation, and Catholic guilt.

Cast

Main cast
 Louis C.K. as Louie

Recurring cast

Guest stars
 Rick Crom as Rick ("Poker/Divorce")
 Jim Norton as Jim ("Poker/Divorce")
 Amy Landecker as Louie's Date ("Bully") / Louie's Mom ("God")
 Adepero Oduye as Tarese ("Dentist/Tarese")
 Matthew Broderick as Matthew ("Heckler/Cop Movie")
 Megan Hilty as Heckler ("Heckler/Cop Movie")
 Chelsea Peretti as Date ("Pilot")
 Tom Noonan as Dr. Haveford ("God")
 Stephen Root as Dr. Hepa ("Dentist/Tarese")
 Godfrey as Godfrey ("Night Out")

Production

C.K. accepted the modest offer of $200,000 (covering his own fee as well as production costs) to do a pilot with FX over prospective production deals with larger networks because they allowed him full executive control of the show. The show is shot on a Red camera setup, and C.K. edits many of the episodes on his personal laptop. In addition to starring, C.K. serves as the series' sole writer and director, an unusual distinction in television production.

"I went [to Hollywood] and I had other networks offering me a lot of money to do a pilot, and I got this call from FX and they said 'Well, we can't offer you a lot of money, but if you do the show for us, you can have a lot of fun.' He was offering me $200,000 as the budget for the whole pilot and I was like 'So, what do I get paid?' and he was like 'No, that's the whole thing, $200,000...' I said 'Look, the only way I'm doing this is if you give me the $200,000 -- wire it to me in New York -- and I'll give you a show. But I'm not pitching it, and I'm not writing a script and sending it to you first.'" 

Production began in November 2009. Louis C.K. said of his show, "It's very vignette-y. It's very vérité. All those French words. I use 'em all." C.K.'s Lucky Louie co-star Pamela Adlon serves as consulting producer of the series.

Episodes

Reception

Reviews
The first season received positive reviews. The season earned 70 out of 100 rating based on 20 reviews on Metacritic. On Rotten Tomatoes, the season has an approval rating of 88% with an average score of 8.5 out of 10 based on 17 reviews. The website's critical consensus reads, "Acerbic, offensive, and smart, Louie has an air of melancholy that separates it from other pessimistic sitcoms." 

The stand-up segments received strong praise, as did the show's perceived "indie film" style, with some likening the show to the work of Woody Allen. Criticisms largely centered on the pacing and low-key delivery of the show's jokes, which often include long setups compared to the rapid-fire punchlines of a traditional sitcom.

Award and nominations
For the 63rd Primetime Emmy Awards, Louis C.K. received a nomination for Outstanding Lead Actor in a Comedy Series, and was also nominated for Outstanding Writing for a Comedy Series for the episode "Poker/Divorce". For the 16th Satellite Awards, C.K. won for Best Actor – Television Series: Musical or Comedy, and the series received a nomination for Best Television Series – Musical or Comedy. For the 27th TCA Awards, the series and C.K. himself were nominated for Outstanding Achievement in Comedy and Outstanding Individual Achievement in Comedy, respectively.

References

External links
 

2010 American television seasons